Bettina Thiele (born 26 October 1963, in Turstenhagen, Germany) is a retired German athlete who competes in compound archery. Her achievements include a silver medal at the 2001 World Archery Championships, and becoming the world number one ranked archer in July 2002.

References

1963 births
Living people
German female archers
World Archery Championships medalists
20th-century German women